The Mannheim Palace Church (German: Mannheimer Schlosskirche), founded as a court chapel, was built in the 18th century and is part of the Mannheim Palace. The church served as court chapel for the prince-electors of the Electorate of the Palatinate between 1731 and 1777 and belongs to the oldest parish churches of the Old Catholic diocese in Germany.

Organ (music) 

The organ was built by the company  Steinmeyer (Oettingen) in 1956 and is a musical keyboard instrument with 34 organ stops (3 transmissions in the pedal) and an electro-pneumatic tracker (Taschenladen). At the balustrade is the Rückpositiv located that carries ornaments with the seal of Charles Philip III .

 Koppeln: II/I, III/I, III/II, I/P, II/P, III/P
 Spielhilfen: two free combinations, a free pedal combination, crescendo pedal

Bells 
There are three bells in the belfry, two of them are baroque bells that have their origins in the building time of the Mannheim Palace.

 Bell 1 h1, diameter 814 mm, 319 kg, cast in 1731 by Mannheim's official bell caster Blasius Sattler
 Bell 2 dis2, diameter 640 mm, 141 kg, cast in 1731 by Blasius Sattler 
 Bell 3 fis2, diameter 546 mm, 113 kg, cast in 1956 by Friedrich Wilhelm Schilling in Heidelberg

See also 
 Mannheim Palace
 Mannheim
 University of Mannheim

External links 
 Official Site of the Mannheim Palace
 Palace Concerts Mannheim

Literature 
 Hans Huth: Die Kunstdenkmäler des Stadtkreises Mannheim I. Munich 1982, .
 Friedhelm Herborn: Schlosskirche Mannheim. 2. Auflage. Munich 1988.
 Alt-Katholische Kirchengemeinde Mannheim (Hrsg.): 120 Jahre Alt-Katholische Gemeinde in der Schlosskirche Mannheim. Mannheim 1994.
 Ferdinand Werner: Die kurfürstliche Residenz zu Mannheim. Worms 2006, .
 Johannes Theil: … unter Abfeuerung der Kanonen: Gottesdienste, Kirchenfeste und Kirchenmusik in der Mannheimer Hofkapelle nach dem Kurpfälzischen Hof- und Staatskalender. Norderstedt 2008, .
 Reiner Albert, Günther Saltin: Katholisches Leben in Mannheim: Bd. 1, Von den Anfängen bis zur Säkularisation (1803). Ostfildern 2009, .
 Stadt Mannheim, Michael Caroli, Ulrich Nieß (Hrsg.): Geschichte der Stadt Mannheim: Bd 1 1607–1801. Ubstadt-Weiher 2007, .
 Hartmut Ellrich, Alexander Wischniewski: Barockschloss Mannheim - Geschichte und Geschichten. Karlsruhe 2013,

Notes and references 

Old Catholicism in Germany
Buildings and structures in Mannheim
Tourist attractions in Mannheim
Churches in Baden-Württemberg
Independent Catholic church buildings